The 2009 Imola Formula Two round was the seventh and penultimate round of the 2009 FIA Formula Two Championship season. It was held on 19 and 20 September 2009 at Autodromo Enzo e Dino Ferrari at Imola, Italy. The first race was won by Kazim Vasiliauskas, with Mirko Bortolotti and Andy Soucek also on the podium. The second race was won by Andy Soucek, with Robert Wickens and Miloš Pavlović also on the podium. Soucek's third place in race one earned him the championship, as Wickens and Mikhail Aleshin had insufficient points to overhaul the Spaniard's point tally.

Classification

Qualifying 1
Weather/Track: Sun 27°/Dry 41°

Race 1
Weather/Track: Sun 21°/Dry 33°

Qualifying 2
Weather/Track: Sun 21°/Dry 33°

Race 2
Weather/Track: Sun 25°/Dry 43°

Standings after the race
Drivers' Championship standings

References

FIA Formula Two Championship